Spring Creek West Township is a township in Dent County, in the U.S. state of Missouri.

Spring Creek West Township was named from Spring Creek.

References

Townships in Missouri
Townships in Dent County, Missouri